Cylindrobulla gigas is a species of sea snail, a marine gastropod mollusk in the family Cylindrobullidae.

Distribution 
 Florida, the Caribbean and Bermuda

Description 
The maximum recorded shell length is 17.5 mm.

Habitat 
Minimum recorded depth is 0.5 m. Maximum recorded depth is 18 m.

References

External links 

Cylindrobullidae
Gastropods described in 1998